Thomas Jefferson Jordan (September 5, 1919 – August 26, 2019) was an American professional baseball player, a catcher who appeared in 39 major league games over three seasons with the Chicago White Sox (1944; 1946), Cleveland Indians (1946), and the St. Louis Browns (1948). He threw and batted right-handed.

Biography
Jordan's professional career took place over a twenty-year period, beginning in the minor leagues in 1938 and ending in 1957 after he was a playing manager for a number of unaffiliated teams in the low minors in the Southwestern United States. He spent the entire 1946 campaign in the major leagues, starting with the White Sox before being traded to Cleveland for fellow catcher Frankie Hayes on July 5. As a member of the Indians, on August 25, he hit his only major league home run, a solo shot at Fenway Park off 20-game-winner Boo Ferriss in a 2–1 Boston Red Sox win.

During his big-league career, Jordan collected 23 hits in 96 at bats, including four doubles and two triples. A son, Tom Jr., was winning pitcher of the championship game of the 1956 Little League World Series. Following the death of Fred Caligiuri, Jordan was recognized as the oldest living major league ballplayer at the time of his death, which occurred just 10 days before his 100th birthday. He was the last living former major league ballplayer born in the 1910s.

References

Further reading

External links

1919 births
2019 deaths
Abbeville A's players
Albuquerque Dukes players
Austin Pioneers players
Baseball players from Oklahoma
Carlsbad Potashers players
Chicago White Sox players
Cleveland Indians players
Kansas City Blues (baseball) players
Major League Baseball catchers
Marshall Tigers players
Milwaukee Brewers (minor league) players
Roswell Rockets players
St. Louis Browns players
San Antonio Missions players
Sportspeople from Lawton, Oklahoma
Shreveport Sports players
Tecolotes de Nuevo Laredo players
Waterloo Hawks (baseball) players
American expatriate baseball players in Mexico